The Beijing Intellectual Property Court is a Court of special jurisdiction in the People's Republic of China, which handles: "first-instance IP civil or administrative cases with professional features involving patents, new varieties of plants, layout design of integrated circuit, know-how and so on." There are similar courts based in Shanghai and Guangzhou.

History
The Beijing IP Court was created at the same time as other courts in China by way of the Decision of the Standing Committee of the National People’s Congress on the Establishment of IP Courts in Beijing, Shanghai and Guangzhou, which was adopted at the 10th session of the 12th Standing Committee of the National People's Congress on 31 August 2014.

The Beijing IP Court closed 5,432 cases in 2015 and 8,111 cases in 2016.

Functions
The Beijing IP court generally has the same functions as the other intermediate IP courts, which include:
Adjudicating over intellectual property infringement disputes.
Complex disputes involving technology, computer software, plant varieties and integrated circuit designs.
Complex disputes involving trade secrets.
Appeals from basic courts on copyright and trademark disputes.
Administrative appeals relating to the validity of trademarks and patents.
Unfair competition disputes.

However, the geographic territory covered by the Beijing IP Court also includes the offices of the Trademark Review and Adjudication Board, and the Patent Reexamination Board of CNIPA. This means that administrative appeals from CBIPA boards are made to the Beijing IP Court.  

Appeals from the Beijing IP Court are to the Supreme People's Court. Beginning in 2019, those appeals go to a specialized IP tribunal within the Supreme People's Court, which is the exclusive appellate venue in China for technology-related IP lawsuits.

Judges
Su Chi
Yang Jing

Use of precedent
China has a civil law system. This means that laws can only be created by the legislature not the courts. Hence, there is no case law in China. However, the Beijing Intellectual Property Court has been trialing a "Case Guidance System" (案例指导制度 ànlì zhǐdǎo zhìdù). While not legally binding, these cases can be considered a type of persuasive precedent. Such cases are used in the following manner:
...For each disputed focus of the case, no more than three cases are submitted; the case should be accompanied by a summary indicating the source of the case, its effective status, and the case in question. Comparison of key facts and similarities, referee rules or methods and standards contained in the case, the referee rules or methods and standards for the inspiration and guidance of the case under trial and its specific reasons. The case summary generally does not exceed 800 words, and the case and its abstracts, reference opinions, etc. can be submitted as an attachment to the complaint and the reply.

Notable cases
Sogou v. Baidu (2015) Jing Zhi Min Chu No.’s 01731, 01732 and 01943: This is the first case in China where the court issued a partial judgement and also the first case to involve software patent infringement.
IWINNComm v. Sony: This case involved a [essential patent|standard essential patent] and the first FRAND injunction in China.
Beijing Daoxiangcun v. Beijing Sudao Food Industry Co., and Suzhou Daoxiangcun (2015).

See also
 Court system of the People's Republic of China

References

External links
CHINA: Beijing IP Court Publishes Initial Results of Case Precedent Pilot Project Article by INTA
Practical exploration of case guidance system in the field of intellectual property 
Return News Sogou wins 3 out of 4 first instance software disputes against Baidu
IWNCOMM v. Sony: Recent Development in FRAND Litigation in China

Intellectual property adjudication bodies
2014 establishments in China
Courts and tribunals established in 2014
Judiciary of China